KZCD (94.1 FM) is a radio station broadcasting a mainstream rock format. Also known as Z94, it serves the Lawton, Oklahoma area. It is owned by Townsquare Media.  Studios are located in downtown Lawton, and the transmitter is located southwest of the city.

KZCD signed on 1987 as adult contemporary KQLI "Lite 94" and changed its call letters to KZCD in 1993.

References

External links

ZCD
Townsquare Media radio stations
Mainstream rock radio stations in the United States
Radio stations established in 1987
1987 establishments in Oklahoma